The wrinkled snake eel (Ophichthus rugifer) is an eel in the family Ophichthidae (worm/snake eels). It was described by David Starr Jordan and Charles Harvey Bollman in 1890. It is a marine, tropical eel which is known from the eastern central and southeastern Pacific Ocean, including the Galapagos Islands and the Cocos Islands. It is also speculated to occur in Malpelo Island.

The species epithet "rugifer" is Latin in origin, and refers to the longitudinal striations that can be easily observed on larger specimens. Due to a lack of known threats and observed population decline, the IUCN redlist currently lists the Wrinkled snake-eel as Least Concern.

References

Fish described in 1890
Ophichthus
Taxa named by David Starr Jordan
Taxa named by Charles Harvey Bollman